José Manuel Ramos Barroso (born February 14, 1928) is a Puerto Rican politician and former Senator. He was a member of the Senate of Puerto Rico from 1977 to 1980.

Biography

José Manuel Ramos Barroso was born in Bayamón, Puerto Rico on February 14, 1928, to Jesús Ramos and Carmen D. Barroso. He studied his elementary and high school at the Colegio Santa Rosa in Bayamón, from 1933 to 1945. From 1945 to 1948, he completed a Bachelor's degree from Mount St. Mary's University and in 1951, received his Juris Doctor from Georgetown Law School in Washington, D.C.

Ramos worked as a private lawyer for 25 years. In the 1970s, he entered politics and was elected to the Senate of Puerto Rico for the District of Bayamón at the 1976 elections. During that term, he served as President pro tempore under Luis A. Ferré. He was reelected at the 1980 elections.

Ramos married Carmen M. Fonseca on August 16, 1956. They had four children together: Carmen M., José A., Luis A., and Carlos R.

References

Members of the Senate of Puerto Rico
1928 births
People from Bayamón, Puerto Rico
Presidents pro tempore of the Senate of Puerto Rico
Living people
Georgetown University Law Center alumni
Mount St. Mary's University alumni